The 1971 Pot Black event was the third edition of Pot Black, a professional invitational snooker tournament which was first broadcast in 1969. The event was recorded in early 1971 at the BBC TV Studios in Gosta Green, Birmingham. The tournament featured eight professional players. All matches were one-frame shoot-outs.

Broadcasts were on BBC2, starting with an introductory programme at 9:45 pm on Wednesday 17 February 1971 The tournament again used a round-robin format with two groups of four players, the top two from each group qualifying for a place in the semi-finals. The players in this event were mainly the same as the previous two, but Ray Reardon was replaced by David Taylor who was making his television debut. Alan Weeks presented the programme, with Ted Lowe as commentator and Sydney Lee as referee.

John Spencer retained his Pot Black title, beating Fred Davis 88–27 in the one-frame final which was broadcast on 2 June 1971.

Main draw

League 1

League 2

Knockout stage

References

Pot Black
1971 in snooker
1971 in English sport